The V. Rev. James Canon McDyer (1910–1987) was a Catholic priest and campaigner for the rights of disadvantaged and underdeveloped rural areas of Ireland.

Biography
Canon McDyer was born, youngest of seven children, in Kilraine in Glenties, County Donegal, on 14 September 1910. He attended Glenties National School before going to St Eunan's College, Letterkenny. In 1930, he went on to St. Patrick's College, Maynooth to study for the priesthood. He was ordained on 20 June 1937. He served as a priest in London during the Blitz, in Wandsworth and in Kent,  and back in Donegal on Tory Island from 1947.

In 1951, the then Fr. McDyer was appointed to Glencolmcille in the Donegal Gaeltacht, where he developed community facilities (at the time the area did not have electricity) and supported initiatives to stop the decline of the area, by developing local industries and the folk village and museum. He was a Canon of Church at the time of his retirement in 1986. He died on 25 November 1987 in his sleep.

References

1910 births
1987 deaths
Alumni of St Patrick's College, Maynooth
20th-century Irish Roman Catholic priests
Irish language activists
People educated at St Eunan's College
People from Glenties